Hooper Bay is a city in Kusilvak Census Area, Alaska, United States. At the 2020 census the population was 1,375, up from 1,093 in 2010.

On August 3, 2006, a major fire destroyed approximately fifteen acres of the city including thirty-five structures,  twelve homes, the elementary school, middle school, high school, teacher housing complex, stores, offices and storage shelters, leaving 70 people homeless.

Geography
The city is separated into two sections: a heavily built-up townsite located on gently rolling hills, and a newer section in the lowlands.

Climate
Hooper Bay is located within the polar climate zone (Köppen ET), because the hottest month is only . It is atypical of polar climates in having winters sufficiently moderated by the sea that permafrost is merely sporadic, and in seeing heavy late summer rainfall more typical of subpolar oceanic climates. The substantial maritime moderation, however, means snowfall is heavy, exceeding or approaching  for eight months of the year

Demographics

Hooper Bay first appeared on the 1880 U.S. Census as an Yup'ik settlement of Askinuk. On the 1890 census, it returned as Askinaghamiut. It did not appear again until 1930, when it was first returned as Hooper Bay. It formally incorporated in 1966.

As of the census of 2000, there were 1,014 people, 227 households, and 187 families residing in the city. The racial makeup of the city was 4.24% White, 93.69% Native American, and 2.07% from two or more races.  0.10% of the population were Hispanic or Latino of any race.

There were 227 households, out of which 61.7% had children under the age of 18 living with them, 34.4% were married couples living together, 30.0% had a female householder with no husband present, and 17.6% were non-families. 15.4% of all households were made up of individuals, and 0.9% had someone living alone who was 65 years of age or older.  The average household size was 4.47 and the average family size was 4.97.

In the city, the age distribution of the population shows 49.2% under the age of 18, 9.0% from 18 to 24, 24.5% from 25 to 44, 11.5% from 45 to 64, and 5.8% who were 65 years of age or older.  The median age was 18 years. For every 100 females, there were 98.8 males.  For every 100 females age 18 and over, there were 116.4 males.

The median income for a household in the city was $26,667, and the median income for a family was $27,500. Males had a median income of $31,250 versus $32,083 for females. The per capita income for the city was $7,841.  About 28.4% of families and 27.9% of the population were below the poverty line, including 30.1% of those under age 18 and 31.6% of those age 65 or over.

Education
Students in pre-kindergarten through twelfth grade attend Hooper Bay School, also known as Naparyarmiut Elicarviat, administered by the Lower Yukon School District. It is a bilingual school with a Yup'ik language immersion program in kindergarten through third grade, the first program of its kind in the district. High school students have the option of the state's public boarding schools, Nenana Student Living Center and Mt. Edgecumbe High School.

In popular culture
 Hooper Bay is the title of an electronic music album by Boards of Canada.

References

Further reading
 Gillham, Charles E., and Chanimun. Medicine Men of Hooper Bay: Or, The Eskimo's Arabian Nights. London: Batchworth Press, 1955.

Photographs 

Cities in Alaska
Cities in Kusilvak Census Area, Alaska
Populated coastal places in Alaska on the Pacific Ocean